The 1961 NAIA World Series was the fifth annual tournament hosted by the National Association of Intercollegiate Athletics to determine the national champion of baseball among its member colleges and universities in the United States and Canada.

The tournament was played at Soos Park in Sioux City, Iowa.

East Carolina (22-4) defeated Sacramento State (22-14) in the championship series, 13–7, to win the Pirates' first NAIA World Series.

East Carolina pitcher Larry Crayton was named tournament MVP.

Bracket

Primary bracket

 East Carolina and Grambling advance to championship bracket.

Consolation bracket

 Omaha advances to championship bracket.

 Sacramento State advances to championship bracket.

Championship bracket

See also
 1961 NCAA University Division baseball tournament

Reference

NAIA World Series
NAIA World Series
NAIA World Series